Eta Funayama Kofun is a kofun, or burial mound, located in Nagomi, Kumamoto in Japan. The mound was designated a National Historic Site of Japan in 1951. Several artifacts excavated from the mound have been designated National Treasures of Japan are now at the Tokyo National Museum (see List of National Treasures of Japan). The style of the bronze items resemble artifacts from the Korean kingdom of Baekje, which had many exchanges with Japan at the time.

Eta Funayama Sword 

The  is a 5th-century ancient iron sword excavated from the mound in 1873. The inscription on the blade indicates that the sword was made during the era of Emperor Yūryaku in the 5th century. This sword, along with other items from the mound, have been designated National Treasures of Japan in the category archaeological materials.

Inscription 
The original inscription and translation is as follows:

Portions of the text are now illegible (rendered above as □ in the Japanese inscription, or ellipses in the English translation), making it difficult to interpret. The name of the ruler, Wakatakiru, is reconstructed from evidence on the Inariyama burial mound sword.

Excavated items

Note

References
 

Kofun period
Old Japanese texts
National Treasures of Japan
Individual Japanese swords
Kofun